James Alexander MacNabb (26 December 1901 – 6 April 1990) was a British rower who competed in the 1924 Summer Olympics.

MacNabb was born at Keighley, West Yorkshire, the son of Rev. James Frederick MacNabb, and his wife Margaret Elizabeth Waterworth. He was educated at Eton and first rowed at Henley in 1920 as a member of the Eton Crew that reached the semi-finals of the Ladies' Challenge Plate. He then went to Trinity College, Cambridge.  At Cambridge, MacNabb, Maxwell Eley, Robert Morrison and Terence Sanders, who had rowed together at Eton, made up the coxless four that in 1922 at Henley won the Stewards' Challenge Cup as Eton Vikings and the Visitors' Challenge Cup as Third Trinity Boat Club. They won the Stewards' Challenge Cup again in 1923. MacNabb rowed for Cambridge in the Boat Race in 1924, and also won Silver Goblets at Henley in 1924 partnering Maxwell Eley.  The coxless four crew won Stewards' at Henley again in 1924 and went on to win the gold medal for Great Britain  rowing at the 1924 Summer Olympics.

MacNabb qualified as an accountant. He was associated with charitable housing for many years and was honorary treasurer at the Amateur Rowing Association for 20 years. He was also honorary secretary and treasurer of Leander Club and a steward of Henley Regatta. He coached the winning Cambridge crew from 1931 to 1933.

MacNabb served in World War II in the Royal Artillery in West Africa and Burma. He attained the rank of lieutenant colonel and was awarded the T.D. He coached the Oxford crew from 1949 to 1951, making him one of the few people to have coached both universities. He was recognised as de jure 21st Chief of Clan Macnab and was succeeded by his son James Charles MacNabb. In 1972 he was awarded the O.B.E for his work with the Peabody Trust.

See also
List of Cambridge University Boat Race crews

References

External links
The MacNab website – The Olympic Games: A Macnab Gold Medal

1901 births
1990 deaths
People educated at Eton College
Alumni of Trinity College, Cambridge
English male rowers
British male rowers
Olympic rowers of Great Britain
Rowers at the 1924 Summer Olympics
English Olympic medallists
Olympic gold medallists for Great Britain
Stewards of Henley Royal Regatta
Royal Artillery officers
British Army personnel of World War II
Olympic medalists in rowing
Members of Leander Club
Medalists at the 1924 Summer Olympics